Finnish Civil War prison camps were operated by the White side of the 1918 Finnish Civil War. They were composed of 13 main camps, mostly active from April to May 1918, and more than 60 smaller POW camps during the final period of the war. The number of captured Red Guard members and associates was approximately 80,000, including 4,700 women and 1,500 children. A total of 12,000 to 14,000 prisoners died in captivity. The camps and their hopeless conditions affected the minds of many people much more deeply than the war itself, although the camps were totally ignored for decades by the White interpretation of the history of the war.

Establishment 

The first prison camps were established at the early stages of war in the White controlled Northern part of Finland. These camps also held 5,000 soldiers of the Imperial Russian Army. In the late March, the number of Red prisoners was only 4,000 but after the Battle of Tampere on 5 April 1918, some 11,000 Red Guard soldiers fell into the hands of the Whites and the first large camp was established in the Kalevankangas district of Tampere. Before the Tampere battle, the captured Reds had mostly been shot, but after the collapse of Tampere the number of prisoners was much too large to carry on the executions.

During the late April, thousands of refugees and Red Guard members headed east towards the Russian border. More than 30,000 were captured by the White troops and the German Baltic Sea Division between the towns of Hämeenlinna and Lahti. 22,000 of them were held for a couple of weeks on a concentration camp founded at the Fellman mansion premises in Lahti. Women and children were mainly released, but 10,900 male refugees and Red Guard members were moved to the Hennala prison camp. Finally, as the war ended on 15 May, around 80,000 Reds were held in more than 60 small camps. During next two months all prisoners were transferred to 13 main camps, located mostly in the southern parts of country.

Executions and the Political Offence Court 

Before the establishment of the Political Offence Court (Valtiorikosoikeus), more than 5,000 capitulated Reds were shot by the decisions of the local Court-martials. The mass executions had started in February under the instructions given by the Commander-in-Chief Carl Gustaf Emil Mannerheim. Court-martials divided the prisoners into three groups: The first group included Red Guard leaders and members of the Red administration as well as all Reds accused of war crimes like murders, arson and looting. They were mostly given death penalties. The second group consisted of all other Red Guard members and associates who were given prison sentences. The third group was categorized as innocent and was released.

Mass executions were finally ceased by commander Mannerheim's order and the Political Offence Court was established in the late May. It was composed of 145 separate courts which handled more than 75,000 cases. The Senate made a decision to keep the prisoners detained until each person's guilt could be examined. Capital punishment was given for 555 Reds but only 113 were executed, as it was possible to plea for mercy.

The Estonian-born Hans Kalm alone was responsible of more than 500 executions at the Hennala prison camp in Lahti. At least 200 of his victims were women and the youngest of them were only 14 years old. 104 of the 1,482 children held in prison camps died. Most of them died of starvation or disease but some 20 were executed, the youngest being only 9-year-old boy.

Living conditions in the camps 
Conditions in the camps were terrible. The Civil War had greatly disrupted agriculture, causing food shortages through the country, and the shortages were particularly bad in the camps since there was no central administration for delivering supplies and prisoners were not allowed to receive deliveries from their families before the end of August.
General hygiene was bad and prisoners died of malnutrition and various diseases like relapsing fever, pneumonia, dysentery and smallpox. The most lethal was the Spanish influenza which caught Finland in July. Viljo Sohkanen, who was held at the Suomenlinna prison camp, described the conditions: 

The most infamous camp was the Tammisaari prison camp in Ekenäs. During the summer, an average of 30 prisoners died every day, making the total number of deceased up to 3,000 with a mortality rate of 34%. In August, the Finnish medical scientist Robert Tigerstedt made a secret report of the prison camps. According to his report ″...such a death rate was never seen before and nothing like that could have happened even during the times of Czarist Russia.″ Tigerstedt's report was leaked to the Swedish press by Finnish Social Democrats and it soon spread to other Scandinavian countries and Great Britain. It is assumed that the report influenced negatively for the general attitude to acknowledge the Independence of Finland. A common rumor says that some foreign powers demanded Finland to improve the conditions of the prison camps or they would postpone their recognition of Finland's independence.

Another famous case was the businessman Hjalmar Linder, one of the wealthiest men in Finland. He made a visit to the Suomenlinna camp to see some of his employees and was shocked. Linder wrote a letter to the Swedish language newspaper Hufvudstadsbladet saying ″the Red Madness has turned into a White Terror as people are dropping dead like flies″. He insisted the prisoners should be released immediately and suggested that they should work a couple of years for their former employers as a forced labor. Linder's humane writings were deeply condemned by the Whites; he was seen as a Red associate, and soon the hatred became so hard that he had to flee the country.

Amnesties 
The camp conditions finally got better in mid-September, as the management was transferred from the White Army to the State Correctional Office. At the same time, nearly 40,000 prisoners were released on parole, and in October, 10,000 more were pardoned. During late 1918, five camps were closed, and the rest worked as labor camps until 1921. At the end of 1919, the number of prisoners was 4,000, and 3,000 were pardoned in January 1920. As the labor camps were closed in 1921, the last 100 prisoners were transferred to Tammisaari camp. The last 50 Reds were released in 1927, and Tammisaari was turned into a penitentiary for political prisoners. It was finally closed in 1940. In 1973, the Finnish government paid reparations to 11,600 persons imprisoned in the camps after the civil war.

List of the main camps
The number of prisoners is based on the book ″Vankileirit Suomessa 1918″ (1971) by the historian Jaakko Paavolainen. Casualties are based on the War Victims of Finland 1914–1922 Internet Database unless otherwise cited.

1 ca. 1,000 Russian soldiers until July 1918
2 ca. 2,000 male prisoners (April–May 1918), ca. 1,000 female prisoners (June–September 1918)

Sources 
Tepora, Tuomas & Roselius, Aapo: The Finnish Civil War 1918: History, Memory, Legacy. Brill Academic Publishers 2014. . Google Books

References 

Finnish Civil War
Prisoner-of-war camps
Internment camps